Hugh Thomas Smith, OBE, AKC was Chaplain-General of Prisons from 1946 to 1961. 
 
Smith was born in 1896, educated at King's College London and ordained in 1928. After a curacy at St Katherine Coleman, Hammersmith he became a prison chaplain, serving at Leeds, Parkhurst, Wandsworth and Wormwood Scrubs before his years as head of the service.

Notes 

1896 births
Alumni of King's College London
Associates of King's College London
Chaplains-General of Prisons
Officers of the Order of the British Empire
Year of death missing